Children of Darkness is a German silent drama film directed by E. A. Dupont and starring Grit Hegesa, Hans Mierendorff, and Sybil Smolova. It was released in two separate parts Der Mann aus Neapel in December 1921 and Kämpfende Welten in January 1922. Both parts premiered at the Ufa-Palast am Zoo.

The film's sets were designed by the art director Paul Leni. It was shot in Berlin and Naples.

Cast
Grit Hegesa as Lilian Grey
Hans Mierendorff as Enrico Flori
Sybil Smolova as Francesca, Enricos Schwester
Charles Puffy as Werkführer Geone
Marija Leiko as Maria Geone
Otto Treßler as Schiffskapitän Pool
Adele Sandrock
Friedrich Kühne
Fritz Schulz
Bernhard Goetzke
Margarete Kupfer
Paul Westermeier

References

External links

1921 films
Films of the Weimar Republic
German silent feature films
Films directed by E. A. Dupont
German black-and-white films
1921 drama films
German drama films
UFA GmbH films
Silent drama films
1920s German films
1920s German-language films